Finland is an unincorporated community and census-designated place (CDP) in Crystal Bay and Beaver Bay townships, Lake County, Minnesota, United States. As of the 2020 census, its population was 195.

Geography
State Highway 1, County Road 6, and County Road 7 are three of the main routes in the community. State Highway 1 continues northwest from Finland  to Ely.

The Baptism River flows through the community.

The community is located within the Finland State Forest in Lake County.

History
A post office called Finland has been in operation since 1915, and a cooperative general store was established in 1913, which is Minnesota's longest continuously operated store. The name of the town comes from the fact that a large portion of the early settlers were Finns. 

The visitor center is the former home of forest ranger and longtime Finland resident O. M. Eckbeck, who built it in 1927.

The Lutheran church was struck by lightning on July 6, 2013, burning down as a result.

Recreation
Finland and the surrounding area host a wide array of outdoor activities. The Superior Hiking Trail (SHT), Wolf Ridge ELC, Sawmill Creek Dome, and Section 13 are located nearby. These destinations attract many hikers, rock climbers, and other outdoor enthusiasts. Information on rock climbing at Sawmill Creek Dome and Section 13 can be found in Minnesota climbing guidebooks.

References

Census-designated places in Minnesota
Finnish-American culture in Minnesota
Census-designated places in Lake County, Minnesota